The Open University of Cyprus (OUC; Greek: Ανοικτό Πανεπιστήμιο Κύπρου), in Lefkosia (Nicosia), is one of the few online/distance universities in Cyprus. The university was established to fill an important gap for open, telematic and distance education in the higher education system of the Republic of Cyprus, in response to the growing demand for continuing education and lifelong learning. It is the first and only Higher Education Institution (HEI) in Cyprus that provides open and distance education at undergraduate and postgraduate level. Placing great emphasis on research, the OUC promotes research programmes aiming towards the development of methodologies and corresponding high technologies for open and distance learning.

Methodology

The Open University of Cyprus style of teaching is called "open and distance learning". More specifically, students have the opportunity to learn in their own time without having to be present at the premises of the university to be able to attend lectures, seminars or labs, as it is the case with conventional universities.

The Open University's degree structure and credit system is based on the concept of Thematic Units (or Modules) adaptable to the European Credit Transfer and Accumulation System (ECTS). The teaching load of an OUC's Thematic Unit corresponds to approximately three (3) semesters at any conventional university. The duration of each Thematic Unit is ten (10) months. OUC students have access to an e-learning platform, an electronic portal where practical information concerning studies at the Open University and related regulations and procedures are posted, as well as information regarding Study Courses, course materials and student workload.

Programmes of study

The full course catalogue for the 2018-2019 academic year include the following programmes:

At the postgraduate level, programmes offered in English:
 Master of Business Administration (MBA)
 Sustainable Enterprise Systems (joint degree with Frederick University)
 Cognitive Systems (joint degree with University of Cyprus)
 Enterprise Risk Management (joint degree with Hellenic Open University)
 Adult Education for Social Change (joint degree with University of Glasgow, Tallinn University, University of Malta and Maynooth University)

At the undergraduate level, programmes offered in Greek:
 Business Administration
 Police Studies (only for graduates of the Cyprus Police Academy)
 Studies in the Hellenic Culture
 Economics

At the postgraduate level, programmes offered in Greek:
 Applied Health Informatics
 Banking and Finance  
 Communications and Journalism
 Continuing Education and Lifelong Learning
 Cultural Policy and Development
 Educational Studies
 Environment Conservation and Management
 European Union Law 
 Greek Language and Literature
 Healthcare Management
 Health Policy and Planning
 Management, Technology and Quality 
 Business Administration (MBA)
 Social Information Systems 
 Theater Studies
 Computer and Network Security
 Wireless Communication systems

Cooperating universities
 Hellenic Open University since 1 March 2013

References

External links
 Official Website
 Cyprus Ministry of Higher Education

Education in Cyprus
Distance education institutions based in Cyprus
Universities and colleges in Cyprus
Educational institutions established in 2002
Education in Nicosia
2002 establishments in Cyprus